The 2014 Oklahoma State Cowboys football team represented Oklahoma State University in the 2014 NCAA Division I FBS football season. The Cowboys were led by tenth-year head coach, Mike Gundy, and played their home games at Boone Pickens Stadium in Stillwater, Oklahoma. They are a charter member of the Big 12 Conference. They finished the season 7–6, 4–5 in Big 12 play to place seventh. They were invited to the Cactus Bowl where they defeated Washington.

Personnel

Coaching staff

Schedule

Schedule Source:

Game summaries

vs. Florida State

Missouri State

UTSA

Texas Tech

Iowa State

Kansas

TCU

West Virginia

Kansas State

Oklahoma State started the game with a 5–3 record (3–2 in conference play).  The Cowboys had just come off their homecoming loss to West Virginia the previous week.  Prior to this game, Oklahoma State led the series 37–23.

Oklahoma State scored in their opening drive by marching down the field and concluding when Tyreek Hill made a 2-yard run for a touchdown.  Ben Grogan's kick made the score 7–0 OSU.  But the ensuing kick-off by Oklahoma State resulted in Morgan Burns successfully running 86 yards for a touchdown. Matthew McCrane's extra point tied the score 7–7 with 11:36 on the clock in the first quarter.  Kansas State's Charles Jones ran in for 6 yards with 4:16 left in the first and Kansas State held the lead for the remainder of the game.  Kansas State achieved 36 unanswered points until Ramon Richards made a 38-yard interception for a touchdown after the K-State starters were pulled from the game.  With 4:49 left in the game, Matthew McCrane was sent out to make an attempt at a 53-yard field goal.  The attempt was good and Kansas State won 48–14.

Texas

Baylor

Oklahoma

Cactus Bowl

Rankings

References

Oklahoma State
Oklahoma State Cowboys football seasons
Guaranteed Rate Bowl champion seasons
Oklahoma State Cowboys football